Tatjana "Tanja" Ljujić-Mijatović (born 11 May 1941) is a Bosnian politician. By vocation, she is a horticulturist and landscape designer. During the Bosnian War, Ljujić-Mijatović served as member of the Presidency of Bosnia and Herzegovina.

Early life and education
Ljujić-Mijatović was born on 11 May 1941 into a Serb family in Sarajevo. Her father was a high-ranking commander in the Yugoslav Partisan resistance movement during World War II. She attended elementary school, high school, and university in Sarajevo.

Having graduated from the University of Sarajevo as an agriculture engineer in 1964, Ljujić-Mijatović obtained a master's degree in landscape design at the University of Belgrade in 1982, followed by a doctoral degree in Sarajevo in 1986. She worked as a landscape designer in Vienna from 1969 until 1971 and in Sarajevo from 1971 to 1979, and became a university professor in Mostar and Sarajevo in 1982.

Political career
Ljujić-Mijatović became politically active during Bosnia and Herzegovina's socialist era. She became a delegate in the People's Assembly in 1991.

When the Bosnian War broke out in 1992, Ljujić-Mijatović rejected Serb nationalist politics, stayed in Sarajevo during the siege of the city by the Bosnian Serb army, and supported the preservation of a multiethnic Bosnia and Herzegovina. When Nenad Kecmanović resigned his post as Serb member of the Presidency of Bosnia and Herzegovina in July 1992, Ljujić-Mijatović was the Serb delegate with most votes in the 1990 general election who was still residing in the government-controlled territory. Biljana Plavšić and Nikola Koljević had also resigned, and two delegates ahead of Ljujić-Mijatović left the country. She duly took her seat in the Presidency, as the only woman among the seven members. In 1993, Ljujić-Mijatović gave an interview in Vienna about the life in besieged Sarajevo, which prompted Alois Mock, the Austrian Foreign Minister, to request that she be named Bosnian ambassador to the United Nations. During the Dayton negotiations, she resolutely opposed the division of Bosnia and Herzegovina.

Following the war, Ljujić-Mijatović remained a member of the Social Democratic Party. From 1998 until 2000, she was the deputy mayor of Sarajevo, and afterward served in the City Council. She is a member of the Serb Civic Council.

Personal life
Ljujić-Mijatović is divorced. She has two daughters, including Dunja Mijatović (born in 1964).

References

1941 births
Living people
Politicians from Sarajevo
Serbs of Bosnia and Herzegovina
University of Sarajevo alumni
Academic staff of the University of Sarajevo
University of Belgrade alumni
Bosnia and Herzegovina women in politics
Social Democratic Party of Bosnia and Herzegovina politicians
Politicians of the Bosnian War
Members of the Presidency of Bosnia and Herzegovina
Permanent Representatives of Bosnia and Herzegovina to the United Nations
20th-century women politicians
Women horticulturists and gardeners
Landscape or garden designers
Female heads of state